Jens Peter Martinus Laursen (1 January 1888 − 27 May 1967) was a Danish gymnast who competed in the 1912 Summer Olympics, held in Stockholm, Sweden. He was part of the Danish team, which won the silver medal in the gymnastics men's team, Swedish system event.

References

External links
Jens Laursen

1888 births
1967 deaths
Danish male artistic gymnasts
Gymnasts at the 1912 Summer Olympics
Olympic gymnasts of Denmark
Olympic silver medalists for Denmark
Olympic medalists in gymnastics
Medalists at the 1912 Summer Olympics